Maure-de-Bretagne (literally Maure of Brittany;) is a former commune in the Ille-et-Vilaine department in Brittany in northwestern France. On 1 January 2017, it was merged into the new commune Val d'Anast.

Population
Inhabitants of Maure-de-Bretagne are called Mauritaniens in French.

See also
Communes of the Ille-et-Vilaine department

References

External links

Official website 

Former communes of Ille-et-Vilaine